Outten is a surname. Notable people with the surname include:

 Keith Outten (1947–2022), Australian rugby league footballer
 Richard Outten, American screenwriter
 William Outten (1948–2020), American politician

See also
 Outen